David Kelly (born December 17, 1965) is an American cartoonist and comics creator. He is best known for his strip, Steven’s Comics, which ran in LGBT and alternative newspapers and zines from 1995 to 1998. His strip has won the Xeric award and he has worked alongside critically acclaimed cartoonist Robert Kirby. He and Kirby co-edited the gay comics zine series Boy Trouble.

Steven’s Comics 
Steven's Comics is set in the 1970s and tells the story of a young gay boy named Steven who draws comics about a super-heroine named Starwoman.

All of Steven’s Comics has been compiled into an anthology graphic novel titled Rainy Day Recess, published by Northwest Press, with some exclusive material made specifically for the volume. Before that, there were several other compilation volumes. The original Xeric award-winning compilation was Steven’s Comics: We Are Family. The others are Steven's Comics: Premiere Edition!, Steven's Comics: Starwoman Comics, and Steven's Comics: New Best Friend.

Publications

Anthologies 

 The Book of Boy Trouble: Gay Boy Comics with a New Attitude 
 Rainy Day Recess: The Complete Steven's Comics

Contributions 

Boy Trouble #1, 2, 3, 4, 5 
Gay Comics #23, 25 
Juicy Mother 
QU33R 
The Stranger
Three #2 
Unsafe for All Ages 2
Young Bottoms in Love

References

External links 

 David Kelly's Instagram
Steven's Comics Instagram

American comics artists
American comic strip cartoonists
American gay artists
1965 births
LGBT comics creators
Underground cartoonists
Queer literature
Living people
21st-century American LGBT people